Pseudagrion massaicum is a species of damselfly in the family Coenagrionidae. It is found in Angola, Botswana, Comoros, the Democratic Republic of the Congo, Ethiopia, Ghana, Kenya, Malawi, Namibia, Somalia, South Africa, Sudan, Tanzania, Uganda, Zambia, Zimbabwe, possibly Burundi, and possibly Guinea. Its natural habitats are subtropical or tropical moist lowland forests, dry savanna, moist savanna, subtropical or tropical dry shrubland, subtropical or tropical moist shrubland, rivers, intermittent freshwater lakes, and freshwater marshes.

References

Coenagrionidae
Insects described in 1909
Taxonomy articles created by Polbot